Namao Ridge and Sturgeon View Estates is an unincorporated community in Alberta, Canada within Sturgeon County that is recognized as a designated place by Statistics Canada. Between 2001 and 2021, Statistics Canada referred to Namao Ridge and Sturgeon View Estates as Namao, which was also the name of the nearby Hamlet of Namao  to the south. 

This designated place consists of two country residential subdivisions – Namao Ridge and Sturgeon View Estates. Namao Ridge, or Namao Ridge Estates, and Sturgeon View Estates were separate designated places in 2001.

Demographics 

See also 
List of communities in Alberta
List of designated places in Alberta

References 

Designated places in Alberta
Localities in Sturgeon County